Operation Alljah was an operation launched by Coalition forces in Iraq, mainly U.S. Marines, in June 2007 to secure the neighborhoods of Fallujah. The strategy of the operation was somewhat based on a successful operation in Ramadi conducted in 2006. Insurgents in the town of Karma nearby were also targeted during the operation, which was part of the overall operation Phantom Thunder.

Strategy
The strategy for Operation Alljah is based on a successful strategy used in the city of Ramadi. Fallujah was divided up into 11 sections managed by individual units of Iraqi policemen. U.S. commanders tried to keep the Iraqis in leading roles, with coalition forces in support.

To separate the parts of the city so that each isolated section could be dealt with more easily, the coalition forces set up barriers, leaving a limited number of access points to get between the districts of the city. This was intended to make it harder for wanted people to move throughout the city, and isolate trouble areas.

Each precinct had a building set as a base of operations, where civilians can receive various services, including food and limited damage reimbursement. These buildings also serve as recruitment centers and bases of operations for the Iraqi police in those precincts. The precinct headquarters also issue ID cards, which make it less of a hassle to get through checkpoints. The ID cards also make it easier to track suspects within the city.

The Operation
In the western Al Anbar province operations attacked insurgent supply lines and weapons caches, targeting the regions of Fallujah, Karma and Tharthar. Commanders of the operation expressed belief that Fallujah would be cleared by August and that the regions of Karma and Tharthar would be cleared by July.

On 17 June, a raid near Karma killed a known Libyan Al-Qaeda fighter and six of his aides and on 21 June six al-Qaeda members were killed and five were detained during early-morning raids also near Karma. Also on 23 June, a U.S. airstrike killed five suspects and destroyed their car bomb near Fallujah. Insurgents also struck back in Fallujah with two suicide bombings and an attack on an off-duty policeman that left four policemen dead on 22 June. On 29 June, U.S. forces killed a senior al-Qaeda leader east of Fallujah. Abu 'Abd al-Rahman al-Masri, an Egyptian, was a veteran of both battles of Fallujah. On 6 July a raid west of Fallujah resulted in the killing of an Al-Qaeda in Iraq battalion commander and two of his men and the capture of two more insurgents.

On 14 August, Marines in Fallujah formally handed over full responsibility for the security of Fallujah to local police. The same day the overall operation Phantom Thunder ended.

Units involved
 Regimental Combat Team 6
2nd Battalion 6th Marines
3rd Battalion 6th Marines
2nd Battalion 7th Marines
 Company B, 2nd Tank Battalion
  Department of Defense Security Forces, Tactical Response Team
 2nd Marine Logistics Group
 5th Battalion 10th Marines Civil Affairs Group (C.A.G)
 3rd Battalion, 509th Parachute Infantry Regiment

See also
2007 in Iraq
Iraq War

References

External links
 "2/6 kicks off Operation Alljah" Marine Corps News story about the start of Operation Alljah
 Philly.com story about a man embedded in a unit involved in Operation Alljah
 "CLB-6 participates in Operation Alljah" Marine Corps News story about a unit involved in Operation Alljah
 "RCT-6 Continues Operation Alljah in Fallujah"

Military operations of the Iraq War involving the United States
Military operations of the Iraq War involving Iraq
Military operations of the Iraq War in 2007
United States Marine Corps in the Iraq War